Ragman may refer to:

 a rag-and-bone man, a junkdealer
 Ragman (character), a fictional DC Comics mystic vigilante
 The Ragman's Daughter, a 1972 film
 The Ragman's Son, the first autobiography by actor Kirk Douglas
 Ragman Rolls, the collection of instruments by which the nobility and gentry of Scotland subscribed allegiance to King Edward I of England
 Răgman village, Poiana Câmpina Commune, Prahova County, Romania

See also
Rag (disambiguation)